Robert Spon is an American professional basketball coach, most recently serving as the head coach for the Cape Breton Highlanders of the National Basketball League of Canada (NBL Canada). He has previously led the Rochester RazorSharks, the Halifax Rainmen, Saint John Mill Rats/Riptide, and several other minor league teams in the past. Spon also has experience coaching the Dakota Wizards, Indiana Alleycats, and Pittsburgh Xplosion in the Continental Basketball Association.

Coaching career 
In 2015, Spon led the Rochester RazorSharks to an undefeated season and a Premier Basketball League championship. Following the season, on May 7, he was named head coach of the Saint John Mill Rats, where he had previously served. The Mill Rats' ownership changed in 2016 but retained Spon as coach. The team was then renamed to the Saint John Riptide. After one more season in Saint John, he was then hired for one season by the NBL Canada's Cape Breton Highlanders as their head coach.

References

External links 
Rob Spon at Eurobasket.com 

1963 births
Living people
American expatriate basketball people in Canada
American men's basketball coaches
Basketball coaches from Pennsylvania
Halifax Rainmen coaches
Quebec Kebs coaches
Saint John Mill Rats coaches
Saint John Riptide coaches
United States Basketball League coaches
Continental Basketball Association coaches
People from Hermitage, Pennsylvania